Guide Me Back Home is a live album by Canadian artist City and Colour. It was recorded during spring 2017 on a tour of Canada, featuring a selection of songs from previous albums performed solo, and a cover of Elliott Smith's Twilight. It was released digitally on October 5, 2018 and physically on November 23, 2018. The album peaked at number 53 on the Canadian Albums Chart

Track list

Chart performance

References

City and Colour albums
2018 live albums